Line 2 of Kunming Metro is a rapid transit line connecting Panlong District with Kunming's urban center, which is currently  long with 14 stations. The line started operation in 2014, and its color is  blue. Currently, through service is provided between Line 1 and this line, meaning passengers from/to Line 1 do not need to transfer at South Ring Road station. Nevertheless, once Line 1 Northwestern extension and Line 2 Phase 2 are completed, this line will be separated from Line 1, and South Ring Road station will become an interchange station.

Opening timeline

Stations

References 

02
Railway lines opened in 2014
2014 establishments in China